The Branco River is a tributary of the Aripuanã River in Mato Grosso in western Brazil. It merges into the Aripuanã River downstream from the town of Aripuanã

See also
List of rivers of Mato Grosso

References
Brazilian Ministry of Transport

Rivers of Mato Grosso